Michael Macari (born 4 February 1973) is a Scottish former professional footballer who played for Stoke City as a striker.

Career
Macari began his career with the West Ham United youth team, before joining Stoke City in 1992 along with his father Lou, who became Stoke's manager. He made his debut in the 1996–97 season where he played in 30 matches scoring three goals. He was released at the end of the season after his father left the club and never played senior football again.

Family
Macari's father Lou and brother Paul were also professional footballers. Another brother, Jonathan, committed suicide in 1999 after being released by Nottingham Forest.

Career statistics

References

External links

1973 births
Living people
People from Kilwinning
Association football forwards
Scottish footballers
West Ham United F.C. players
Stoke City F.C. players
English Football League players
Footballers from North Ayrshire
Footballers from Greater Manchester
Anglo-Scots
Scottish people of Italian descent